In quantum chemistry and molecular physics, the Born–Oppenheimer (BO) approximation is the best-known mathematical approximation in molecular dynamics. Specifically, it is the assumption that the wave functions of atomic nuclei and electrons in a molecule can be treated separately, based on the fact that the nuclei are much heavier than the electrons. Due to the larger relative mass of a nucleus compared to an electron, the coordinates of the nuclei in a system are approximated as fixed, while the coordinates of the electrons are dynamic. The approach is named after Max Born and J. Robert Oppenheimer who proposed it in 1927, in the early period of quantum mechanics.

The approximation is widely used in quantum chemistry to speed up the computation of molecular wavefunctions and other properties for large molecules. There are cases where the assumption of separable motion no longer holds, which make the approximation lose validity (it is said to "break down"), but even then the approximation is usually used as a starting point for more refined methods.

In molecular infrared spectroscopy, using the BO approximation means considering molecular energy as a sum of independent terms, e.g.:  These terms are of different orders of magnitude and the nuclear spin energy is so small that it is often omitted. The electronic energies  consist of kinetic energies, interelectronic repulsions, internuclear repulsions, and electron–nuclear attractions, which are the terms typically included when computing the electronic structure of molecules.

Example 

The benzene molecule consists of 12 nuclei and 42 electrons. The Schrödinger equation, which must be solved to obtain the energy levels and wavefunction of this molecule, is a partial differential eigenvalue equation in the three-dimensional coordinates of the nuclei and electrons, giving 3 × 12 + 3 × 42 = 36 nuclear + 126 electronic = 162 variables for the wave function. The computational complexity, i.e., the computational power required to solve an eigenvalue equation, increases faster than the square of the number of coordinates.

When applying the BO approximation, two smaller, consecutive steps can be used:
For a given position of the nuclei, the electronic Schrödinger equation is solved, while treating the nuclei as stationary (not "coupled" with the dynamics of the electrons). This corresponding eigenvalue problem then consists only of the 126 electronic coordinates. This electronic computation is then repeated for other possible positions of the nuclei, i.e. deformations of the molecule. For benzene, this could be done using a grid of 36 possible nuclear position coordinates. The electronic energies on this grid are then connected to give a potential energy surface for the nuclei. This potential is then used for a second Schrödinger equation containing only the 36 coordinates of the nuclei.

So, taking the most optimistic estimate for the complexity, instead of a large equation requiring at least  hypothetical calculation steps, a series of smaller calculations requiring  (with N being the number of grid points for the potential) and a very small calculation requiring  steps can be performed.

The slope of the potential energy surface can be used to simulate molecular dynamics, using it to express the mean force on the nuclei caused by the electrons and thereby skipping the calculation of the nuclear Schrödinger equation.

Detailed description 
The BO approximation recognizes the large difference between the electron mass and the masses of atomic nuclei, and correspondingly the time scales of their motion. Given the same amount of momentum, the nuclei move much more slowly than the electrons. In mathematical terms, the BO approximation consists of expressing the wavefunction of a molecule as the product of an electronic wavefunction and a nuclear (vibrational, rotational) wavefunction. . This enables a separation of the Hamiltonian operator into electronic and nuclear terms, where cross-terms between electrons and nuclei are neglected, so that the two smaller and decoupled systems can be solved more efficiently.

In the first step the nuclear kinetic energy is neglected, that is, the corresponding operator Tn is subtracted from the total molecular Hamiltonian. In the remaining electronic Hamiltonian He the nuclear positions are no longer variable, but are constant parameters (they enter the equation "parametrically"). The electron–nucleus interactions are not removed, i.e., the electrons still "feel" the Coulomb potential of the nuclei clamped at certain positions in space. (This first step of the BO approximation is therefore often referred to as the clamped-nuclei approximation.)

The electronic Schrödinger equation

where  is the electronic wavefunction for given positions of nuclei (fixed R), is solved approximately. The quantity r stands for all electronic coordinates and R for all nuclear coordinates. The electronic energy eigenvalue Ee depends on the chosen positions R of the nuclei. Varying these positions R in small steps and repeatedly solving the electronic Schrödinger equation, one obtains Ee as a function of R. This is the potential energy surface (PES): . Because this procedure of recomputing the electronic wave functions as a function of an infinitesimally changing nuclear geometry is reminiscent of the conditions for the adiabatic theorem, this manner of obtaining a PES is often referred to as the adiabatic approximation and the PES itself is called an adiabatic surface.

In the second step of the BO approximation the nuclear kinetic energy Tn (containing partial derivatives with respect to the components of R) is reintroduced, and the Schrödinger equation for the nuclear motion

is solved. This second step of the BO approximation involves separation of vibrational, translational, and rotational motions. This can be achieved by application of the Eckart conditions. The eigenvalue E is the total energy of the molecule, including contributions from electrons, nuclear vibrations, and overall rotation and translation of the molecule. In accord with the Hellmann–Feynman theorem, the nuclear potential is taken to be an average over electron configurations of the sum of the electron–nuclear and internuclear electric potentials.

Derivation
It will be discussed how the BO approximation may be derived and under which conditions it is applicable. At the same time we will show how the BO approximation may be improved by including vibronic coupling. To that end the second step of the BO approximation is generalized to a set of coupled eigenvalue equations depending on nuclear coordinates only. Off-diagonal elements in these equations are shown to be nuclear kinetic energy terms.

It will be shown that the BO approximation can be trusted whenever the PESs, obtained from the solution of the electronic Schrödinger equation, are well separated:

.

We start from the exact non-relativistic, time-independent molecular Hamiltonian:

with

The position vectors  of the electrons and the position vectors  of the nuclei are with respect to a Cartesian inertial frame.

We assume that the molecule is in a homogeneous (no external force) and isotropic (no external torque) space. The only interactions are the two-body Coulomb interactions among the electrons and nuclei. The Hamiltonian is expressed in atomic units, so that we do not see Planck's constant, the dielectric constant of the vacuum, electronic charge, or electronic mass in this formula. The only constants explicitly entering the formula are ZA and MA – the atomic number and mass of nucleus A.

It is useful to introduce the total nuclear momentum and to rewrite the nuclear kinetic energy operator as follows:

The electronic wave functions  will be taken to be real, which is possible when there are no magnetic or spin interactions. The parametric dependence of the functions  on the nuclear coordinates is indicated by the symbol after the semicolon.

For example, in the molecular-orbital-linear-combination-of-atomic-orbitals (LCAO-MO) approximation,  is a molecular orbital (MO) given as a linear expansion of atomic orbitals (AOs). An AO depends visibly on the coordinates of an electron, but the nuclear coordinates are not explicit in the MO.

We will assume that the parametric dependence is continuous and differentiable, so that it is meaningful to consider

which in general will not be zero.

The total wave function  is expanded in terms of :

with

and where the subscript  indicates that the integration, implied by the bra–ket notation, is over electronic coordinates only. By definition, the matrix with general element

is diagonal. After multiplication by the real function  from the left and integration over the electronic coordinates  the total Schrödinger equation

is turned into a set of K coupled eigenvalue equations depending on nuclear coordinates only

The column vector  has elements . The matrix  is diagonal, and the nuclear Hamilton matrix is non-diagonal; its off-diagonal (vibronic coupling) terms  are further discussed below. The vibronic coupling in this approach is through nuclear kinetic energy terms.

Solution of these coupled equations gives an approximation for energy and wavefunction that goes beyond the Born–Oppenheimer approximation.
Unfortunately, the off-diagonal kinetic energy terms are usually difficult to handle. This is why often a diabatic transformation is applied, which retains part of the nuclear kinetic energy terms on the diagonal, removes the kinetic energy terms from the off-diagonal and creates coupling terms between the adiabatic PESs on the off-diagonal.

If we can neglect the off-diagonal elements the equations will uncouple and simplify drastically.

The diagonal matrix elements  of the operator  vanish, because we assume time-reversal invariant, so  can be chosen to be always real. The off-diagonal matrix elements satisfy

The matrix element in the numerator is

The matrix element of the one-electron operator appearing on the right side is finite.

When the two surfaces come close, the nuclear momentum coupling term becomes large and is no longer negligible. This is the case where the BO approximation breaks down, and a coupled set of nuclear motion equations must be considered instead of the one equation appearing in the second step of the BO approximation.

The third term on the right side of the expression for the matrix element of Tn (the Born–Oppenheimer diagonal correction) can approximately be written as the matrix of  squared and, accordingly, is then negligible also. Only the first (diagonal) kinetic energy term in this equation survives in the case of well separated surfaces, and a diagonal, uncoupled, set of nuclear motion equations results:

which are the normal second step of the BO equations discussed above.

We reiterate that when two or more potential energy surfaces approach each other, or even cross, the Born–Oppenheimer approximation breaks down, and one must fall back on the coupled equations. Usually one invokes then the diabatic approximation.

The Born–Oppenheimer approximation with correct symmetry

The starting point is the nuclear adiabatic BO (matrix) equation written in the form

 

Here  are eigenfunctions of the electronic Hamiltonian assumed to form a complete Hilbert space in the given region in configuration space.

To study the scattering process taking place on the two lowest surfaces, one extracts from the above BO equation the two corresponding equations:

Next a new function is introduced:

and the corresponding rearrangements are made:
 Multiplying the second equation by i and combining it with the first equation yields the (complex) equation 
Consequently, the last term is, indeed, negligibly small at every point in the region of interest, and the equation simplifies to become 

The equation with an elastic potential can be solved, in a straightforward manner, by substitution. Thus, if  is the solution of this equation, it is presented as

where  is an arbitrary contour, and the exponential function contains the relevant symmetry as created while moving along .

The function  can be shown to be a solution of the (unperturbed/elastic) equation

Having , the full solution of the above decoupled equation takes the form

where  satisfies the resulting inhomogeneous equation:

In this equation the inhomogeneity ensures the symmetry for the perturbed part of the solution along any contour and therefore for the solution in the required region in configuration space.

The relevance of the present approach was demonstrated while studying a two-arrangement-channel model (containing one inelastic channel and one reactive channel) for which the two adiabatic states were coupled by a Jahn–Teller conical intersection.  A nice fit between the symmetry-preserved single-state treatment and the corresponding two-state treatment was obtained. This applies in particular to the reactive state-to-state probabilities (see Table III in Ref. 5a and Table III in Ref. 5b), for which the ordinary BO approximation led to erroneous results, whereas the symmetry-preserving BO approximation produced the accurate results, as they followed from solving the two coupled equations.

See also
 Adiabatic ionization
 Adiabatic process (quantum mechanics)
 Avoided crossing
 Born–Huang approximation
 Franck–Condon principle
 Kohn anomaly

Notes

References

External links
Resources related to the Born–Oppenheimer approximation:
 The original article (in German)
 Translation by S. M. Blinder
 The Born–Oppenheimer approximation, a section from Peter Haynes' doctoral thesis

Quantum chemistry
Approximations
Max Born